"Different" is the seventh single by Japanese rock band Band-Maid, released in Japan on December 2, 2020, by Nippon Crown. The song was used as the opening theme song for the third season of the anime Log Horizon.

Composition
The lyrics for "Different" are about Log Horizon.

Critical reception
Anime News Network said of the title track "This song just doesn't QUIT. The drums and the bass are insane from start to finish." Raijin Rock called the title track "the greatest single of the year." JaME wrote that the single shows that the band "are still doing great creating both skillful music and explosive tracks." And stated that "Don't Be Long" "is so catchy that you will definitely want to experience it again and again."

Music video
The music video for "Different" was released on December 1, 2020.

Live performances
A live version of "Different" was later released on their video album: Band-Maid Online Okyu-Ji (Feb. 11, 2021). "Don't Be Long" was played live over a year prior to the release of the single.

Track listing
CD

Credits and personnel
Band-Maid members
 Misa – bass
 Miku Kobato – vocals, guitar
 Saiki Atsumi – vocals
 Akane Hirose – drums
 Kanami Tōno – guitar

Recording and management
 Recorded at Nasoundra Palace Studio
 Recording engineer: Masyoshi Yamamoto
 Mixed at Mix Forest
 Mix engineer: Masahiko Fukui
 Mastered by Masahiko Fukui
 Design by Kyoko Ando

Charts

Release history

References

External links
 Discography – Band-Maid official website

2020 singles
Anime songs
Band-Maid songs
Japanese-language songs